Tengchiena is a genus of very small air-breathing land snails, terrestrial pulmonate gastropod mollusks in the family Euconulidae, the hive snails.

Species 
Species within the genus Tengchiena include:
 Tengchiena euroxestus

References

 Taxonomicon info

 
Euconulidae
Taxonomy articles created by Polbot